Alois Lichtsteiner (born 9 July 1950) is a Swiss painter.

References

20th-century Swiss painters
Swiss male painters
21st-century Swiss painters
21st-century Swiss male artists
1950 births
Living people
20th-century Swiss male artists